Motoring Along is an album by Al Cohn and Zoot Sims recorded in Sweden in 1974 for the Sonet label.

Reception 

The Allmusic review by Scott Yanow stated "As usual the two saxophonists mutually inspire each other on the cool-toned but frequently-heated bop date".

Track listing 
 "Stockholm – L.A." (Al Cohn) – 4:50
 "My Funny Valentine" (Richard Rodgers, Lorenz Hart) – 8:38
 "Yardbird Suite" (Charlie Parker) – 7:57
 "Motoring Along" (Jimmy McGriff) – 4:47
 "Fallin'" (Cohn) – 7:04
 "What the World Needs Now" (Burt Bacharach, Hal David) – 8:40

Personnel 
Al Cohn – tenor saxophone
Zoot Sims – tenor saxophone, soprano saxophone
Horace Parlan – piano
Hugo Rasmussen – bass
 Sven Erik Norregaard – drums

References 

1975 albums
Sonet Records albums
Al Cohn albums
Zoot Sims albums